Andrew Jones  (born 1961) is a Church in Wales priest. He has been Archdeacon of Merioneth since 2010.

Jones was educated at Bangor University and the Church of Ireland Theological Institute. He was a Minor Canon at Bangor Cathedral from 1985 to 1988. He was the Incumbent at Dolgellau from 1988 to 1992; and a Lecturer at St. Michael's College, Llandaff from 1992 to 1996. He was Rector of Llanbedrog from 1996 until 2012.

References

1961 births
Living people
Archdeacons of Merioneth
Alumni of Bangor University
Alumni of the Church of Ireland Theological Institute